Odostomia geoffreyi is a species of sea snail, a marine gastropod mollusk in the family Pyramidellidae, the pyrams and their allies.

References

External links
 World Register of Marine Species entry

geoffreyi
Gastropods described in 1939